Joseph Esposito (born Giuseppe Esposito, October 6, 1871 - March 21, 1928) was an American politician best known for his involvement in bootlegging, extortion, prostitution and labor racketeering in Chicago, Illinois during the Prohibition era.

Early life

Esposito was born on October 6, 1871, in Acerra, Campania, Italy. He immigrated to Illinois and joined one of the street gangs terrorizing Chicago's Little Italy during the early 1900s. When the Volstead Act was enacted and Prohibition in the United States began, Esposito's organization, the 42 Gang, which included Sam "Momo" Giancana and Paul "The Waiter" Ricca, entered into  bootlegging. Esposito's early success with the Genna Brothers may have been a factor in the 1920 murder of rival James "Big Jim" Colosimo, a long time racketeer who had been hesitant to begin his own bootlegging operations.

Rise to power and politics

By the early 1920s, Esposito earned another nickname, Diamond Joe, due to his frequent wearing of diamond cufflinks, diamond rings, and other jewelry. Esposito had become a Republican ward boss of the Nineteenth Ward in Chicago. He was one of the earliest Italian Americans elected as aldermen. Esposito provided political protection to the bootlegging gangs of Chicago's Italian communities, including the South Side gang of mob boss Johnny Torrio and the Genna brothers. In May 1921, Esposito famously attended the funeral of his political protégé Antonio D'Andrea. Several years later, Esposito also attended the funeral of another criminal ally, Angelo Genna murdered on May 25, 1925.

Rivalry with Al Capone and death

After Torrio's retirement, Esposito rivaled the activities of  his old gang, now led by Al Capone and known as the Chicago Outfit.  On March 21, 1928, Esposito was attacked and killed in a drive-by shooting on his front steps, with his two nieces right inside the house. It is often speculated Capone was behind the murder.

References

Further reading
Allswang, John Myers. The Political Behavior of Chicago's Ethnic Groups, 1918-1932. Ayer Publishing, 1980. 
Chiocca, Olindo Romeo. Mobsters and Thugs: Quotes from the Underworld. Toronto: Guernica Editions, 2000. 
Lashly, Arthur V. Illinois Crime Survey. Chicago: Illinois Association for Criminal Justice and the Chicago Crime Commission, 1929.
Johnson, Curt and R. Craig Sautter. The Wicked City: Chicago from Kenna to Capone. New York: Da Capo Press, 1998. 
Merrinier, James L. Grafters and Goo Goos: Corruption and Reform in Chicago, 1833-2003. Southern Illinois Univ. Press, 2004. 
Reppetto, Thomas A. American Mafia: A History of Its Rise to Power. New York: Henry Holt & Co., 2004.

External links
Joseph "Diamond Joe" Esposito at Find A Grave

1871 births
1928 deaths
People from Acerra
American political bosses from Illinois
Politicians from Chicago
American gangsters of Italian descent
People murdered in Illinois
Male murder victims
Deaths by firearm in Illinois
Illinois Republicans